The 1997–98 Azadegan League was the seventh season of the Azadegan League that was won by Esteghlal. The following is the final results of the Azadegan League's 1997–98 football season.

Final classification

Summary 

 Iranian football champions: Esteghlal
 Relegated: Bahman, Esteghlal Ahvaz, Payam Khorasan, Bargh Shiraz
 Promoted: Aboomoslem, Chooka Talesh, Malavan, Bank Melli

Player statistics

Top goalscorers 
16
 Hossein Khatibi (Shahrdari Tabriz)

Azadegan League seasons
Iran
1997–98 in Iranian football